Vistula University (VU; Polish: Akademia Finansów i Biznesu Vistula) is a non-public academic higher education institution based in Warsaw, Poland. It was established in 1992 as the University of Insurance and Banking. Its branch since 2019, is Aleksander Gieysztor Academy of Humanities in Pułtusk.

Vistula University has achieved its current status through dynamic development and cooperation with other non-public higher education institutions. Together with the Vistula School of Hospitality (formerly the Warsaw School of Tourism and Hospitality Management), they constitute the pillars of the intensively expanding Vistula Group of Universities.

Vistula University is an international business school characterized by a multicultural and innovative approach to contemporary and future global challenges. It prepares students for careers in the areas of management, finance and accounting, international relations, economics, philology, journalism, graphics, architecture and computer engineering, as well as pedagogy, history, political science and national security. The university's study offer comprises bachelor's, master's, engineering, doctoral, and MBA programs conducted in Polish and English. Its research areas comprise, among others, the issues of China, globalization, chemical and ecological security or cybersecurity. The university remains in close cooperation with ICCSS (International Center for Chemical Safety) in Warsaw.

Vistula University belongs to the elite group of higher education institutions entitled to use the name and logo of HR Excellence in Research.

Academic programs

Vistula University offers the following programs in English and Polish:

Economics
Strengths in the department include banking, development economics, industrial organization, international trade and finance, labor economics, macroeconomics, microeconomic theory, and finance. While the faculty work in a diverse set of fields, a common characteristic of their research is the application of theoretical and quantitative tools to the analysis of important practical issues. Research at VU has looked at, among other things, post-communist era in Eastern Europe, monetary union, European integration, privatization, and pension reform.

VU award bachelor's degrees in the following fields of specialization:
 Bachelor in Finance
 Bachelor in Banking
 Bachelor in International Business and Trade
 Bachelor in Accounting
 Bachelor in Integration with EU Economics and EU Funds
 Bachelor in Economics Sociology
 Bachelor in Application of Computer Science in Economics

VU award master's degrees in the following fields of specialization:
 Master in International Finance and Banking
 Master in International Business and Trade
 Master in European Studies and EU Funds
 Master in Business Tourism
 Master in Application of Computer Science in Economics

Computer science/engineering
The graduates of VU acquire skills in computer systems, software design and programming, operating and maintenance of hardware, as well as administering and management of networks.
Students who successfully complete undergraduate studies are entitled to continue their education in the master's degree program in the field of Applications of Computer Technologies in Economics.

VU awards Bachelor's and master's degrees in the following fields of specialization:
 Internet Technologies
 Computer Systems Management
 Application of Computer Technologies in Business
 Database Applications

International relations
Students pursue a course of study in world politics, taking courses in political science, economics, history and foreign languages, learning how to approach, analyze and manage settings that involve political and diplomatic aspects. In the course of their studies, students acquire intercultural communication and negotiation skills. The department's curriculum allows students to take a variety of courses including international security, international political economy, political and economic development, foreign policies, diplomacy, conflicts and conflict management.

VU awards bachelor's degrees in the following fields of specialization:
 European Union Studies
 Diplomacy
 International Economic Relations
 Sociology of International Relations
 Political Sociology

Tourism and recreation
Department of Tourism and Recreation provides education in organizational management, human resource management and tour operation aspects of the global tourism industry. Through its close cooperation with Meeting Professional
International (MPI), Warsaw Convention Bureau, International Congress Convention Association (ICCA), as well as The Society of Incentives and Travels Executives (SITE), it enables students to participate in international conferences in Warsaw, London, Barcelona and the United States.

VU awards bachelor's degrees in the following fields of specialization:
 Business Tourism
 Hotel Management
 International Tourism

Philology
The undergraduate program in English philology provides comprehensive training in all areas of English studies. Coursework is offered in grammar, advanced literature, historical periods, important authors and literary
movements, literary theory and linguistics. All students develop a broad competence in general topics of English philology before moving to a more specialized knowledge of a single area or topic.

Vistula University awards bachelor's degrees in the following fields:
 Business English
 Linguistics – Translation
 Contrastive Linguistics
 Cultural Studies

Sociology
Vistula University awards bachelor's degrees in the following fields of specialization:
 Media and Communication
 Sociology in Business
 Political Sociology

Graduate studies
Graduate program in Polish:
 Real Estate Management
 Real Estate Valuation
 Human Resource Management
 EU Lobbying (in association with Ambassador's Club and BCC Business Center Club)
 Methodology of Teaching Foreign Languages
 Specialised Translation
 Integrated IT Systems in Companies
 Creation and Management of Companies

Graduate program in English:
 Hospitality Management (in association with top Hotels and Restaurants located in Warsaw)

Library
VU library has a collection of books, periodicals and digital media to
support the education research activities at the university. All books and media are catalogued
and searchable online.

Vistula University library has:
 120,000 volumes
 130 comfortable seats for students in the reading room
 30 desktop PCs inside the campus enabling the students to use library resources online
 14 PCs with the library catalogues
 2 PCs with access to the research database LEX POLONICA
 MAK computer system which provides access to the National Library databases

Sports
There is a broad range of sport facilities where University students engage in sports individually or in teams. VU has a modern sports hall (600 m2) for basketball, volleyball, indoor soccer, badminton, table tennis, aerobics, and tennis courts, a well-equipped gym and an open tartan basketball court. Students have ideal conditions for exercise, both during physical education classes and/or as a member of AZS (Academic Sport Association). Currently the leading and most active sport sections are: rowing, badminton, indoor soccer, volleyball and Wushu. VU Academic Sport Association brings students together, helps them master
their skills and encourages them to participate in academic competitions in various disciplines. VU sports hall of fame includes Olympic Games and national championships contenders. Students with superior athletic abilities can easily apply for scholarships.

Social life and student affairs
VU students have many opportunities for extra-curricular activities and for participating
in social-academic events including:
 Ambassador's Club
 Badminton
 Indoor Football
 Volleyball
 Basketball
 Wushu
 Tennis
 Table Tennis
 Athletes Club
 Vocal Ensemble
 Karaoke Club
 Chess Club
 Painting, Drawing & Photography Club
 Movie Makers Club
 Marketing Club
 Students’ European Economic and Social Science Circle
 Summer and Winter Camps
 Foreign Language Club

Office of career planning and student internships
Office of Career Planning and Student Internships assists students from early periods of the beginning of their studies. Compulsory student internships constitute an integral element of the program at the level of undergraduate studies.
Internships allow students to acquire invaluable skills and experience that will be crucial in professional life. The university cooperates with international and local companies under COOP EDU program.

Co-op education (cooperative education)
COOP EDU is a pioneer cooperative education program in Poland. It integrates higher education and business, so that skills and qualifications acquired in the course of studies meet requirements of labor market and employers.

Scholarships
VU has a straightforward scheme of scholarships and tuition fee waivers for international students. The university mainly funds stipends from its own resources. In general, Vistula University offers the following scholarships: 
 Laureates of national and international student competitions study for free!
 First semester tuition fee waiver for top ten candidates of bachelor's degree programs – eligibility criteria: secondary school GPA and performance on entrance examination (oral or written exam in candidate's country of residence)
 First semester tuition fee waiver for top five candidates for master's degree programs – eligibility criteria: Bachelor's degree GPA and performance on entrance examination (oral or written exam in candidate's country of residence)

International cooperation
A fundamental factor that determines development of education and research studies at a university is its international cooperation with foreign universities, secondary schools, institutions, industries, companies, NGOs, media and other operators of public and private sectors worldwide. VU participates in serious socio-cultural, environmental, business and other multidimensional projects globally.

Students and faculty of VU benefit from a wide range of international exchange opportunities under the Socrates, Erasmus and other international education programs. The university cooperates with a number of universities including:
 Andalusian Association of Spanish Schools for Foreigners (Spain)
 Bahcesehir University (Turkey)
 Bleking Institute of Technology (Sweden)
 Brno University of Technology (Czech Republic)
 East Ukrainian National University (Ukraine)
 Fachhochschule Nordhausen (Germany)
 Gafgas University (Azerbaijan)
 International Business School (Hungary)
 Lyngby Business School (Denmark)
 Salzburg University of Applied Sciences (Austria)
 TOBB Economics and Technology University (Turkey)
 University of Applied Science (Germany)
 University of Florence (Italy)
 Minsk University (Belarus)
 Vigo University (Spain)
 Vilnius College in Higher Education (Lithuania)
 Vorarlberg University of Applied Sciences (Austria)
 WESFORD (Grenoble, France)
 University of Perugia (Italy)
 Universidad de Almeria (Spain)
 Damodaram Sanjivayya National Law University (India)

Vu students have opportunities to travel abroad for study tours, summer schools and professional training programs. For instance, students of English Philology have a chance for a 4-week training session organized by the Polish Department in the Directorate-General for Translation (DGT)of the European Commission (EC).

Prep school ETS (educational testing service)
To study where English is the medium of instruction, students should submit a proficiency test result of any of the following examinations:
TOEFL, FCE, CAE, TELC, IELTS, etc. Otherwise, students are subject to taking a proficiency test to prove their level of English. Submitting a secondary school diploma is sufficient for an applicant to study at the Preparatory School. After completing their prep-school studies, students take a final proficiency test. Whether the applicant wishes to study at VU or at another Polish university, the VU Preparatory School Language Proficiency Test Certificate will allow them to study at any department of Polish universities.

VU is an accredited partner of ETS (Educational Testing Service). Educational Testing Service is the biggest, independent non-profit organization, dealing with research in the sphere of education and creation of evaluation systems. Headquarters of ETS is located in Princeton, USA.

References

Educational institutions established in 1996
Universities and colleges in Warsaw
1996 establishments in Poland